Barber may refer to:

Professions
Barber
Barber surgeon, a medical practitioner of medieval Europe

People
Barber (surname)

Places

United States
Barber, California
Barbers, Georgia
Barber County, Kansas
Barber Township, Minnesota
Barber, New Jersey
Barber, Oklahoma

Elsewhere
Barber, Curaçao

Other uses
The Barber Institute of Fine Arts, an art gallery
Barber Motorsports Park
Barber paradox
Sleeping barber problem
Sal Maglie, professional baseball player known as "The Barber"
Barbershop music
The Barber (disambiguation)
Barber coinage, former coin designs of United States dimes, quarters, and half dollars

See also
Barbour (disambiguation)